Bergüzar Gökçe Korel (born 27 August 1982) is a Turkish actress.

Career 
Korel made her debut as Leyla in Kurtlar Vadisi: Irak (Valley of the Wolves: Iraq). She came to wide attention after starring as Şehrazat Evliyaoğlu in Binbir Gece. She appeared in Magnificent Century as a guest role of Monica Teresse for one episode (Episode 24). In 2012, she starred as Feride Şadoğlu alongside Kenan İmirzalıoğlu in the popular  series Karadayı.

Personal life 

Her family is of Cretan Turk, Rumelian Turk and Albanian descent. She graduated from the Theatre department of the Mimar Sinan Fine Arts University. In August 2009, Korel married fellow actor Halit Ergenç, who was her partner in Binbir Gece. In February 2010, she gave birth to the couple's first child, a boy named Ali. Another son, named Han, was born in March 2020, followed by a daughter, named Leyla, in November 2021.

Filmography

Film

Television

Presenter/host
 2009 – Bergüzarla Çocuktan Al Haberi

Discography
Albums
 2016 – Aykut Gürel Presents: Bergüzar Korel
 2020 – Aykut Gürel Presents: Bergüzar Korel, Vol. 2

Awards

References

External links 
 Berguzar Korel on TurkishStarsDaily

1982 births
Turkish film actresses
Turkish television actresses
Actresses from Istanbul
Living people
Turkish people of Albanian descent
Turkish people of Circassian descent
Golden Butterfly Award winners